A control system manages, commands, directs, or regulates the behavior of other devices or systems using control loops. It can range from a single home heating controller using a thermostat controlling a domestic boiler to large industrial control systems which are used for controlling processes or machines. The control systems are designed via control engineering process.

For continuously modulated control, a feedback controller is used to automatically control a process or operation.   The control system compares the value or status of the process variable (PV) being controlled with the desired value or setpoint (SP), and applies the difference as a control signal to bring the process variable output of the plant to the same value as the setpoint.

For sequential and combinational logic, software logic, such as in a programmable logic controller, is used.

Open-loop and closed-loop control

Feedback control systems

Logic control
Logic control systems for industrial and commercial machinery were historically implemented by interconnected electrical relays and cam timers using ladder logic. Today, most such systems are constructed with microcontrollers or more specialized programmable logic controllers (PLCs). The notation of ladder logic is still in use as a programming method for PLCs.

Logic controllers may respond to switches and sensors and can cause the machinery to start and stop various operations through the use of actuators.  Logic controllers are used to sequence mechanical operations in many applications. Examples include elevators, washing machines and other systems with interrelated operations. An automatic sequential control system may trigger a series of mechanical actuators in the correct sequence to perform a task. For example, various electric and pneumatic transducers may fold and glue a cardboard box, fill it with the product and then seal it in an automatic packaging machine.

PLC software can be written in many different ways – ladder diagrams, SFC (sequential function charts) or statement lists.

On–off control

On–off control uses a feedback controller that switches abruptly between two states. A simple bi-metallic domestic thermostat can be described as an on-off controller. When the temperature in the room (PV) goes below the user setting (SP), the heater is switched on. Another example is a pressure switch on an air compressor. When the pressure (PV) drops below the setpoint (SP) the compressor is powered. Refrigerators and vacuum pumps contain similar mechanisms. Simple on–off control systems like these can be cheap and effective.

Linear control

Fuzzy logic

Fuzzy logic is an attempt to apply the easy design of logic controllers to the control of complex continuously varying systems. Basically, a measurement in a fuzzy logic system can be partly true.

The rules of the system are written in natural language and translated into fuzzy logic. For example, the design for a furnace would start with: "If the temperature is too high, reduce the fuel to the furnace. If the temperature is too low, increase the fuel to the furnace."

Measurements from the real world (such as the temperature of a furnace) are fuzzified and logic is calculated arithmetic, as opposed to Boolean logic, and the outputs are de-fuzzified to control equipment.

When a robust fuzzy design is reduced to a single, quick calculation, it begins to resemble a conventional feedback loop solution and it might appear that the fuzzy design was unnecessary. However, the fuzzy logic paradigm may provide scalability for large control systems where conventional methods become unwieldy or costly to derive.

Fuzzy electronics is an electronic technology that uses fuzzy logic instead of the two-value logic more commonly used in digital electronics.

Physical implementation

The range of control system implementation is from compact controllers often with dedicated software for a particular machine or device, to distributed control systems for industrial process control for a large physical plant.

Logic systems and feedback controllers are usually implemented with programmable logic controllers.

See also

 Building automation
 Coefficient diagram method
 Control theory
 Cybernetics
 Distributed control system
 Droop speed control
 Education and training of electrical and electronics engineers
 EPICS
 Good regulator
 Guidance, navigation, and control
 Hierarchical control system
 HVAC control system
 Industrial control system
 Motion control
 Networked control system
 Numerical control
 Perceptual control theory
 PID controller
 Process control
 Process optimization
 Programmable logic controller
 Real-time computing
 Sampled data system
 SCADA
 VisSim

References

External links

 SystemControl Create, simulate or HWIL control loops with Python. Includes Kalman filter, LQG control among others.
 Semiautonomous Flight Direction - Reference unmannedaircraft.org
 Control System Toolbox for design and analysis of control systems.
 Control Systems Manufacturer Design and Manufacture of control systems.
 Mathematica functions for the analysis, design, and simulation of control systems
 Python Control System (PyConSys) Create and simulate control loops with Python. AI for setting PID parameters.

Control theory
Control engineering
Systems engineering
Systems theory
&